Rodmarton Platform was a railway station serving the village of Rodmarton on the Tetbury branch line between Cirencester and Tetbury in Gloucestershire.  The station opened on 1 September 1904 and closed in April 1964 as a result of the Beeching Axe.

Rodmarton Platform was the first Great Western station to use the name "platform".  The term originally came from Scottish railway stations was used by Great Western to describe stations smaller than fully-fledged stations but longer than halts, and ones that offered services such as ticket sales, mail transport and some light goods. The wooden platform carried a "Pagoda" shelter for passenger use.

Rodmarton Platform was opened to serve the small village of Rodmarton, though the railway and station was sited some distance from the village.

Route

References 

Disused railway stations in Gloucestershire
Former Great Western Railway stations
Railway stations in Great Britain opened in 1904
Railway stations in Great Britain closed in 1964
Beeching closures in England